The 1985 Clemson Tigers football team was an American football team that represented Clemson University in the Atlantic Coast Conference (ACC) during the 1985 NCAA Division I-A football season. In its eighth season under head coach Danny Ford, the team compiled a 6–6 record (4–3 against conference opponents), tied for third place in the ACC, lost to Minnesota in the 1985 Independence Bowl, and outscored opponents by a total of 244 to 222. The team played its home games at Memorial Stadium in Clemson, South Carolina.

Steve Berlin and Steve Reese were the team captains. The team's statistical leaders included quarterback Rodney Williams with 772 passing yards, Kenny Flowers with 1,200 rushing yards and 78 points scored (13 touchdowns), and Terrance Roulhac with 533 receiving yards.

Schedule

Personnel

References

Clemson
Clemson Tigers football seasons
Clemson Tigers football